Meg Mason (born New Zealand) is an Australian author. Her novel Sorrow and Bliss, was short listed for the 2022 Women's Prize for Fiction.

She was a journalist for Financial Times, Vogue and The New Yorker.

She was influenced by Jane Austen, and George Saunders.

Works 

 Say It Again in a Nice Voice, Collins, 2012. 
 You Be Mother. Fourth Estate, 2017. 
 Sorrow and Bliss, Harper, 2020.

References

External links 

 Breakfast with… Meg Mason Toast magazine, 16 May 2022

Australian novelists
Australian writers
Living people
Year of birth missing (living people)